Irish Luck is a 1939 American comedy adventure film directed by Howard Bretherton.

The film is also known as Amateur Detective in the United Kingdom.

Plot

Cast 
Frankie Darro as Buzzy O'Brien
Dick Purcell as Steve Lanahan
Lillian Elliott as Mrs. O'Brien
Dennis Moore as Jim Monahan
James Flavin as Hotel Detective Fluger
Sheila Darcy as Kitty Monahan
Mantan Moreland as Jefferson
Ralph Peters as Detective Jenkins
Tristram Coffin as Mr. Mace - Hotel Desk Clerk
Pat Gleason as Banning - Bond Robber
Gene O'Donnell as Bond Robber
Donald Kerr as Reporter
Howard M. Mitchell as Hotel Manager
Aloha Wray as Dancer

References

External links 

1939 films
1930s comedy mystery films
American detective films
American black-and-white films
Monogram Pictures films
American comedy mystery films
1939 comedy films
1930s English-language films
1930s American films